Dryden Brook is a river in Delaware County, New York. It flows into Cannonsville Reservoir west-northwest of Rock Rift.

References

Rivers of New York (state)
Rivers of Delaware County, New York